The Leonard School is a historic school building at 356 West Britannia Street in Taunton, Massachusetts.  It is a two-story brick structure, with a hip roof and a projecting front section that is topped by a truncated tower.  A large gable in front of this tower is filled by a large half-round window.  An enclosed gable-roof porch shelters the main entrance.  Built in 1888 in the Italianate style, it is one of several local schools designed by Gustavus L. Smith. It is named after the locally prominent Leonard family, who were leaders in the city's industrial development.

It was added to the National Register of Historic Places in 1984. It closed in 2009.

See also
National Register of Historic Places listings in Taunton, Massachusetts

References

National Register of Historic Places in Taunton, Massachusetts
School buildings completed in 1888
School buildings on the National Register of Historic Places in Massachusetts
Buildings and structures in Taunton, Massachusetts
Schools in Bristol County, Massachusetts